Whigville (also Freedom) is an unincorporated community in Noble County, Ohio, United States.

History
Whigville was originally called Freedom, and under the latter name was laid out in 1846. The name was officially changed to Whigville in 1891. A post office called Whigville was established in 1851, and remained in operation until 1934.

Notable person
Capell L. Weems, Ohio politician, was born in Whigville.

Notes

Unincorporated communities in Noble County, Ohio
Unincorporated communities in Ohio